William Leader (19 October 1767 – 18 January 1828) was a prosperous malt merchant and British Member of Parliament for Camelford and Winchelsea

He represented Camelford from 1812 to 1818, and Winchelsea from 1823 to 1826.

His father, William Leader, was coachmaker to the prince of Wales. Leader married in 1792 (his wife and mother both named Mary). He had two sons, William killed in a carriage accident at the age of 24, and John Temple Leader (1810–1903), and four daughters. Temple Leader and Leader's nephew William Leader Maberly (1798–1885) also became MPs.

His grave is in Putney Old Burial Ground.

References

1767 births
1828 deaths
Members of the Parliament of the United Kingdom for English constituencies
UK MPs 1812–1818
UK MPs 1820–1826
Members of Parliament for Camelford